Krishnaraja Assembly constituency is one of the 224 constituencies in the Karnataka Legislative Assembly of Karnataka with having all the areas under the zone of Mysore south such as Ashokapuram, Vidyaranyapuram, JP Nagar, Srirampura, Mysore Palace, Agrahara, KR circle, and Vishweranagara. It is also part of Mysore Lok Sabha constituency.

Members of Legislative Assembly

See also
 Mysore South
 Mysore district
 Mysore Lok Sabha constituency
 List of constituencies of Karnataka Legislative Assembly

References

 

Assembly constituencies of Karnataka
Mysore district